Luis Manuel Medina (March 31, 1968  – February 14, 2017) was a Dominican broadcast journalist and host for the FM radio station 103.5 HICC in San Pedro de Macorís, Dominican Republic. He was fatally shot along with his producer during a Facebook live-streaming video.

Personal life 
Luis Manuel Medina was a native of the Dominican Republic, born on March 31, 1968. Medina was raised in Consuelo, San Pedro de Macorís Province. He graduated from the communications program at Universidad Central del Este, a private university in his home province. He is buried in Consuelo, San Pedro de Macorís Province.

Career 
Medina was a broadcast journalist for twenty-five years. He was employed by 103.5 HICC, an FM radio station located in San Pedro de Macorís Province. At 103.5 FM, Medina co-hosted a popular morning radio program titled Milenio Caliente (Hot Millennium in English), where he often gave live news updates. He also hosted other radio shows for 103.5 FM. Before he worked for 103.5, Medina was employed by Radio Dial and worked on the news program Reportero 670. Medina was also widely known as the voice of the Dominican professional baseball team, Estrellas Orientales.

Death 
Luis Manuel Medina was fatally shot on February 14, 2017, during a Facebook live-streaming broadcast in the Centro Comercial del Este area. The attacker first opened fire on Medina's co-producer, Leonidas Martínez, in the station while Medina was reading the news for a live news update for Milenio Caliente. Gunshots could be heard in the background along with a female voice yelling "Shots! Shots! Shots!" The attacker then entered the recording studio and shot and killed Medina. Both Medina and Martínez were killed during the attack. A station secretary, Dayana García de Fernandez, was injured in the stomach and required surgery at the Centro Médico Macoríx, a hospital. The attacker was later identified as José Rodríguez, a 59-year-old man who had a grievance with the pair over either land or as a result of their media work, such as a report from a week earlier about polluted lands.

Context 
The murder of journalists in the Dominican Republic is rare. In Medina's case, there was no immediate motive, although Medina had criticized a political movement in San Pedro de Macorís Province.

Journalists killed on air or in front of a camera have become more common since 2015. In the United States, journalist Alison Parker and camera operator Adam Ward were killed on air on August 26, 2015. The Committee to Protect Journalists has highlighted the danger to journalists.

Reactions

See also
 Telecommunications in the Dominican Republic

References 

1968 births
2017 deaths
Filmed killings
Deaths by firearm in the Dominican Republic
Assassinated Dominican Republic journalists
Male journalists